Graeme Murphy is an Appeals judge with the Supreme Court of Western Australia. Before his appointment he was a partner with the national firm Blake Dawson Waldron.

References

Judges of the Supreme Court of Western Australia
Living people
Year of birth missing (living people)
Place of birth missing (living people)